The tawny frog (Neobatrachus fulvus), or tawny trilling frog, is a species of frog in the family Limnodynastidae. It is endemic to Australia.

Its natural habitats are subtropical or tropical dry shrubland, subtropical or tropical dry lowland grassland, and intermittent freshwater marshes.

References

Neobatrachus
Amphibians of Western Australia
Taxonomy articles created by Polbot
Amphibians described in 1986
Frogs of Australia